Mark J. LaVarre (born February 21, 1965) is an American former professional ice hockey player, who played 65 games in the National Hockey League. He played for the Chicago Blackhawks. He also represent United States at the 1984 World Junior Ice Hockey Championships.

LaVarre was born in Chicago, IL. As a youth, he played in the 1978 Quebec International Pee-Wee Hockey Tournament with a minor ice hockey team from Chicago.

References

External links

http://www.eliteprospects.com/player.php?player=29250

1965 births
Living people
American men's ice hockey right wingers
Chicago Blackhawks draft picks
Chicago Blackhawks players
Ice hockey players from Illinois